The 1986–87 NBA season was the 76ers 38th season in the NBA and 24th season in Philadelphia. In the 1986 Draft, the Sixers made two trades that would cloud the franchise for over a decade. The Sixers traded the Number 1 overall pick to the Cleveland Cavaliers (who used this selection to draft Brad Daugherty), for Roy Hinson and cash. They also traded Moses Malone, Terry Catledge, and two first round draft picks to the Washington Bullets for Jeff Ruland and Cliff Robinson.

Brad Daugherty would have multiple All-Star selections with the Cavs, while Hinson was dealt away after having a short, unremarkable career (less than 1 and 1/2 years) in Philadelphia.  Malone would go to the 1987 NBA All Star game, and Jeff Ruland played in a total of 5 games that season, before sustaining an injury that would keep him out of the NBA until a short stint with the Sixers in the 1992 season.

These two trades were so devastating in that, with the exception of the 2001 season in which they won the Eastern Conference Championship, they have not been considered an elite franchise since, after being one for a period from 1977 to that point. They have won just three division titles after this trade (1990, 2001, 2021), and registered only five seasons of greater that 50 wins (53 in 1990, 56 in 2001, 52 in 2018, and 51 in 2019 and 2022) from 1987 to 2021.

The Sixers would finish nine games worse than the previous season at 45–37, and lose in the first round of the playoffs to the Milwaukee Bucks. This would be the 16th and final season for Julius Erving, who in his last regular season home game, became just the third player in ABA-NBA history to score over 30,000 points for a career. Each road city had a farewell ceremony to honor him.

Draft picks

Roster

Regular season

Season standings

z - clinched division title
y - clinched division title
x - clinched playoff spot

Record vs. opponents

Playoffs

|- align="center" bgcolor="#ffcccc"
| 1
| April 24
| @ Milwaukee
| L 104–107
| Charles Barkley (21)
| Charles Barkley (13)
| Cheeks, Toney (9)
| MECCA Arena11,052
| 0–1
|- align="center" bgcolor="#ccffcc"
| 2
| April 26
| @ Milwaukee
| W 125–122 (OT)
| Roy Hinson (28)
| Charles Barkley (15)
| Maurice Cheeks (11)
| MECCA Arena11,052
| 1–1
|- align="center" bgcolor="#ffcccc"
| 3
| April 29
| Milwaukee
| L 120–121
| Charles Barkley (39)
| Cliff Robinson (10)
| Cheeks, Toney (8)
| Spectrum14,361
| 1–2
|- align="center" bgcolor="#ccffcc"
| 4
| May 1
| Milwaukee
| W 124–118
| Charles Barkley (25)
| Charles Barkley (13)
| Maurice Cheeks (11)
| Spectrum15,464
| 2–2
|- align="center" bgcolor="#ffcccc"
| 5
| May 3
| @ Milwaukee
| L 89–102
| Julius Erving (24)
| Charles Barkley (13)
| Cheeks, Wingate (5)
| MECCA Arena11,052
| 2–3
|-

Player statistics

Playoffs

Awards and records
 Charles Barkley, All-NBA Second Team
 Maurice Cheeks, NBA All-Defensive Second Team

References

See also
 1986-87 NBA season

Philadelphia 76ers seasons
Phil
Philadelphia
Philadelphia